Eddie Watkins (2 March 1916 – 28 June 1995) was a Welsh dual-code international rugby player who played club rugby under the union code for Cardiff, and later professional league rugby with Wigan. As a union player Watkins was part of the 1939 team which won the Home Nations Championship, and was more famously a member of the Welsh side that beat the touring All Blacks in 1935. In 1939 he joined Wigan and played in three internationals during the war years for Wales league side against England.

During the Second World War he served in the Special Investigation Branch of the Royal Air Force, and played in two Services internationals.

Rugby union career
Watkins began his club rugby days with Bedwas before moving to first class side Cardiff. In 1935, Watkins was chosen by Cardiff to face the touring New Zealand team. Cardiff were hoping that a strong pack containing Watkins, Les Spence and Gwyn Williams would give the club an advantage against the All Blacks, but were soundly beaten in an exciting game.

Watkins gained his was first cap for Wales in 1935 again against New Zealand. In a memorable game, Wales turned around a losing score-line in the last ten minutes to beat the All Blacks 13–12. Watkins was not selected for Wales throughout 1936, but was back for the final two games of the 1937 Home Nations Championship. It was a poor campaign for Wales and Watkins, with Wales losing all matches during the 1937 campaign. Watkins was reselected for the 1938 Championship, playing all three games. The opening game was against England at the Cardiff Arms Park, and under the captaincy of Cardiff team-mate Cliff Jones, Watkins was involved in his first Home Nations victory. In 1939 Watkins took part in his last Home Nations campaign, and although missing the game against Ireland, he was still a member of a Wales Championship winning team as Wilf Wooller's team lifted the trophy with wins over Ireland and Scotland.

International games played
Wales, rugby union
  1938, 1939
  1937, 1938
  1935
  1937, 1938, 1939

Rugby league career
In March 1939 Watkins joined professional rugby league team Wigan for a reported fee of £600, making his first appearance for the club on 18 March. During his time with Wigan, he made three appearances for the Wales national rugby league side, his first was played at Odsal against England on 18 October 1941.

Championship final appearances
Eddie Watkins played right-, i.e. number 12, in Wigan's 12–5 victory over Dewsbury in the Championship Final second-leg during the 1943–44 season at Crown Flatt, Dewsbury on Saturday 20 May 1944 (Jack Cayzer having played right- in the first-leg), and played right- in the 13–4 victory over Huddersfield in the Championship Final during the 1945–46 season at Maine Road, Manchester on Saturday 18 May 1946.

International games played
Wales, rugby league
  1941, 1943, 1945

Bibliography

References

External links
Cardiff RFC Season Review 1938 - 1939

1916 births
1995 deaths
Glamorgan Police officers
Bedwas RFC players
Cardiff RFC players
Dual-code rugby internationals
Royal Air Force personnel of World War II
Rugby league players from Caerphilly
Rugby union locks
Rugby union players from Caerphilly
Wales international rugby union players
Wales national rugby league team players
Welsh police officers
Welsh rugby league players
Welsh rugby union players
Welsh schoolteachers
Wigan Warriors players